Neurobasis australis is a species of damselfly in the family Calopterygidae,
commonly known as a Papuan demoiselle. 
It is a large, metallic green damselfly with long legs, and dark wings without pterostigma.
It has been recorded from New Guinea, 
and Indonesia, where it inhabits streams.

Gallery

Notes
Early records of Neurobasis australis in Australia have not been confirmed.

References

Calopterygidae
Insects of New Guinea
Insects of Indonesia
Insects of Southeast Asia
Taxa named by Edmond de Sélys Longchamps
Insects described in 1897
Damselflies